Giovanni Paolo Cervetto (died 1657) was an Italian painter of the Baroque period. He was very active in his native Genoa. He was  pupil of Valerio Castelli, and his works were difficult to separate from his master. He died young, likely from the Bubonic Plague that afflicted Genoa in 1657.

References

Year of birth unknown
1657 deaths
17th-century Italian painters
Italian male painters
Painters from Genoa
Italian Baroque painters
17th-century deaths from plague (disease)